The 2019 Milex Open was a professional tennis tournament played on green clay courts. It was the fifth edition of the tournament which was part of the 2019 ATP Challenger Tour. It took place in Santo Domingo, Dominican Republic between 7 and 13 October 2019.

Singles main-draw entrants

Seeds

 1 Rankings were as of 30 September 2019.

Other entrants
The following players received wildcards into the singles main draw:
  Peter Bertran
  Víctor Estrella Burgos
  Carlos Gómez-Herrera
  Nick Hardt
  José Olivares

The following player received entry into the singles main draw as an alternate:
  Alejandro González

Champions

Singles

 Juan Pablo Varillas def.  Federico Coria 6–3, 2–6, 6–2.

Doubles

 Ariel Behar /  Gonzalo Escobar def.  Orlando Luz /  Luis David Martínez 6–7(5–7), 6–4, [12–10].

References

2019 ATP Challenger Tour
2019
2019 in Dominican Republic sport
October 2019 sports events in North America